The Finnish/Swiss Tour is a live album by American avant-garde jazz composer, bandleader, and multi-instrumentalist Hal Russell recorded in 1991 and released on the ECM label in 1992.

Reception
The Allmusic review awarded the album 4½ stars stating "This is an extraordinary record, full of fire, reckless abandon, and thrilling playing from Russell, obviously, but also from his great band". In JazzTimes Marc Masters wrote "the deliriously happy sound of The Finnish/Swiss Tour is equally worthy of reverent veneration and ecstatic celebration".

Track listing
ECM – ECM 1455

Personnel
Hal Russell: tenor saxophone, soprano saxophone, trumpet, vibraphone, drums
Mars Williams: tenor saxophone, soprano saxophone, didgeridoo
Brian Sandstrom: bass, trumpet, guitar
Kent Kessler: bass, bass guitar, didgeridoo
Steve Hunt: drums, vibraphone, didgeridoo

References

ECM Records live albums
Hal Russell live albums
1991 live albums
NRG Ensemble albums